Roxas Boulevard is a popular waterfront promenade in Metro Manila in the Philippines. The boulevard, which runs along the shores of Manila Bay, is well known for its sunsets and stretch of coconut trees. The divided roadway has become a trademark of Philippine tourism, famed for its yacht club, hotels, restaurants, commercial buildings and parks.

The boulevard was completed in the 1910s. Originally called Cavite Boulevard, it was renamed Dewey Boulevard in honor of the American admiral George Dewey, whose forces defeated the Spanish navy in the Battle of Manila Bay in 1898, Heiwa Boulevard in late 1941 during the Japanese occupation, and finally Roxas Boulevard in the 1960s in honor of President Manuel Roxas, the fifth president of the Philippines. It was also designated as a new alignment of the Manila South Road that connects Manila to the southern provinces of Luzon. 

The boulevard is also an eight-lane major arterial road in Metro Manila designated as Radial Road 1 (R-1) of Manila's arterial road network, National Route 61 (N61), the shortest primary route in the Philippines, National Route 120 (N120) of the Philippine highway network and a spur of Asian Highway 26 (AH26). The arcing road runs in a north–south direction from Luneta in Manila and ends in Parañaque at the intersection of MIA Road and Seaside Drive, beneath the elevated NAIA Expressway. Beyond its southern terminus, starts the Manila-Cavite Expressway (E3), also known as the Coastal Road, or more recently, CAVITEX.

History

City Beautiful movement
The Cavite Boulevard was part of Architect Daniel Burnham's plan for beautifying the city of Manila. At the request of Commissioner William Cameron Forbes, Burnham visited the country in 1905 at the height of the City Beautiful movement, a trend in the early 1900s in America for making cities beautiful along scientific lines, for the future urban development of Manila and Baguio.

Original concept

"In order to make the boulevard presentable and useful as soon as possible, a quick-growing tree like the acacia might be planted, alternating with the trees of slower growth, and be replaced after the latter attain their growth. The boulevard's seaward side should be planted so as to interrupt occasionally the view of the sea and, by thus adding somewhat of mystery, enhance the value of the stretch of ocean and sky. The boulevard would be on reclaimed land to about as far south as the old Fort San Antonio Abad in Malate, beyond which it strikes the beach and follows the shoreline to Cavite. The possible extension of the ocean boulevard along the north shore would naturally depend upon the development of the town in that direction and upon the question of additional harbor works north of the Pasig River."

Route description
Roxas Boulevard starts at Rizal Park in Manila as a physical continuation of Bonifacio Drive. The road passes through many tall buildings, restaurants, banks, monuments, and other establishments as it curves along Manila Bay. The United States Embassy is located in the vicinity of Rizal Park; a kilometer south, the headquarters of Bangko Sentral ng Pilipinas (BSP) and Philippine Navy are located within the Malate district of Manila. After the BSP building, the boulevard enters Pasay, passing through the Cultural Center of the Philippines (CCP Complex) and Star City. It then intersects with Gil Puyat Avenue and Jose W. Diokno Boulevard, where it ascends through the Gil Puyat Flyover. It then parallels Macapagal Boulevard. It ascends again to intersect Epifanio delos Santos Avenue (EDSA) through the flyover of the same name; there, the route number transitions from N120/AH26, a secondary road, to N61, a primary road. A few meters after passing EDSA, it enters Parañaque, continues into a straight route until it ends on an intersection with MIA Road and Seaside Drive, where the road continues south as Manila–Cavite Expressway (CAVITEX/E3), which is also known as Coastal Road.

Landmarks

Parks
 Rizal Park

CCP Complex

 Folk Arts Theater
 Manila Film Center
 Tanghalang Pambansa
 Star City

Convention and trade center
 Philippine International Convention Center (CCP Complex)
 World Trade Center Metro Manila (CCP Complex)

Government buildings
 Bangko Sentral ng Pilipinas (Central Bank of the Philippines)
 Department of Foreign Affairs
 Department of Finance
 Philippine Navy
 Senate of the Philippines (GSIS Building)

Foreign embassies
 Embassy of the United States in Manila
 Embassy of Japan in Manila

Museums
 Metropolitan Museum of Manila (Central Bank of the Philippines Complex)
 Museo Pambata (the old Manila Elks Club)
 Bangko Sentral ng Pilipinas Money Museum (Central Bank of the Philippines Complex)
 Asian Institute of Maritime Studies Museo Maritimo (AIMS Maritime College Campus)

Hospitals
 San Juan de Dios Educational Foundation, Inc. - Hospital

Hotels
 Manila Hotel
 Diamond Hotel
 Sofitel Philippine Plaza Hotel (CCP Complex)
 Heritage Hotel Manila
 Midas Hotel and Casino
 Admiral Hotel
 Bayview Park Hotel Manila
 City of Dreams Manila

Yacht club
 Manila Yacht Club

Educational Institutions
 Asian Institute of Maritime Studies
 San Juan de Dios Educational Foundation, Inc. - College
 Singapore School Manila

Intersections

See also
Baywalk
Major roads in Metro Manila

References

External links

Philippines Tourist Attractions

Streets in Manila
Boulevards
Ermita
Malate, Manila